Lesley Bamberger (born 1965/1966) is a Dutch billionaire businessman, and the owner of Kroonenberg Groep, a privately held real estate company founded by his grandfather, Jacob Kroonenberg.

Bamberger joined Kroonenberg Groep in 1986, and inherited it in 1996 following his grandfather's death. Kroonenberg Groep owns retail, industrial and residential property in the Netherlands and the US.

Bamberger lives in Amsterdam, Netherlands.

References

Living people
Dutch billionaires
1960s births